Super Star, also known as TTV Super Star since 2020 is an annual Chinese New Year's Eve television special produced by Taiwanese broadcaster TTV. It is broadcast simultaneously on television and on the OTT platform, nationally and internationally by the TTV network and by some overseas broadcasters (mainly Singapore and Malaysia) which also acquired programming rights to air the program. Taiwan Mobile was later sponsored the event and carried digital rights for simulcast premiere in Taiwan starting from the 2018 edition. The first special premiered on February 13, 2010, the eve of the 2010's Chinese New Year, and has span a total of 14 competitions since.

The competition is basically similar to the NHK's New Year's Eve special, Kōhaku Uta Gassen, which first premiered in 1951, albeit several differences from the original counterpart.

History and Format
Similar to Kōhaku Uta Gassen, these songs and performers are examined by a selection committee put together by TTV. The basis for selection are record sales and adaptability to the edition's theme.

At the same time, a demographic survey is conducted regarding the most popular singers for each and what kind of music people want to hear. This and the song selection explain the amalgamation of the musical genres and its artists.

The show was first announced on October 27, 2009 with Chang Hsiao-yen and Harlem Yu announced as hosts for the special. The special was taped on February 3, 2010 and first broadcast on February 13, 2010, and was held on National Taiwan University Sports Center. Beginning 2011, the special was held at the permanent venue of Taipei Arena.

In 2015, the broadcast was transitioned to High-definition television. In 2018, the number of hosts were added and mediators are now included to serve as the hosts for the special. Chang and Harlem left the show and were respectively replaced by Nadow Lin & Mary Wu and Sam Wang & Jade Chang, except in 2023 edition which hosted by Chen Ming Chu and YELLOW, whose also hosted the red carpet ceremony for Golden Melody Awards and Golden Horse Awards respectively, while Mickey Huang served as the show's overall mediator. The show also introduced a newly revamped logo per the renewal process, such as the inclusion of inverted exclamation mark in the middle of the red and white words for 2018–2020 edition and the mirror image between the letter R and W for 2022 edition, in which the later celebrate its networks 60th anniversary.

Beginning in 2020, Super Star introduced a mascot, "Super King" (an Orangutan dressed in red and white colored shirt with the TTV logo) to promote the competition.

Similar to Kōhaku, the competition is divided into teams of two, either the red team or white team; however, these teams are not gender-affiliated unlike the original. At the end of all performances, the results are determined by the votes cast from the live audience. For 2019 and 2020, voting was expanded to include the social media viewers, resulting in a turnout of over a million votes. However, in 2021, voting was determined by the social media viewers alone as the contest was held closed doors as a result of the COVID-19 pandemic, this also delayed the announcement of the final results, which was posted on its Facebook page instead of airing it. These changes are reverted in the 2022 edition using the pre-2019 voting format; although the votes from the social media viewers didn't revealed during 2023 edition as the broadcast was also premiered on their YouTube channel outside Taiwan (except both Singapore and Malaysia, in which they still got exclusive broadcasting rights).

Unlike Kōhaku, all of the contests are pre-recorded days or even weeks (in which Taiwanese Chinese New Year public holidays was held the day before CNY eve) before actual broadcast, instead of broadcasting live, due to post-production, including the addition of Traditional Chinese captions.

Results

See also
Kōhaku Uta Gassen - the original programme based on Super Star

References

External links
Official Website

NHK Kōhaku Uta Gassen
Chinese New Year
Non-Japanese television series based on Japanese television series
Taiwanese television series based on non-Taiwanese television series
2010 Taiwanese television series debuts
New Year's television specials
Annual television shows